The Faculty of Music at the University of Toronto is one of several professional faculties at the University of Toronto. The Faculty of Music is located at the Edward Johnson Building, just south of the Royal Ontario Museum and north of Queen's Park, west of Museum Subway Station. MacMillan Theatre and Walter Hall are located in the Edward Johnson Building. The Faculty of Music South building contains rehearsal rooms and offices, and the Upper Jazz Studio performance space is located at 90 Wellesley Street West. In January 2021, the Faculty announced Dr. Ellie Hisama as the new Dean starting July 1, 2021.

Historical timeline

1844 Music was considered a discipline worthy of recognition by the University of Toronto (named King's College until 1850) and examinations were held for candidates wishing to receive a degree in music.
1846 James Paton Clarke became the first person in Canada to be awarded the degree of Bachelor of Music.
1858 George Strathy received Canada's first D Mus at Trinity College.
1886 The Toronto Conservatory of Music was incorporated, and was operated in conjunction with the University of Toronto from its beginnings.
1904 Trinity College was relieved of the music degree, and the MusBac became a University of Toronto degree.
1918 The Faculty of Music was established. The Senate of the University withdrew its affiliations with various music schools (Toronto College of Music and Royal Hamilton College of Music) and inaugurated a Faculty of Music to teach music and administer examinations. Along with his duties as music director of the Toronto Conservatory, Augustus Stephen Vogt was appointed Dean.
1921 The Ontario Legislature passed Bill 154, an act that vested the assets of the Toronto Conservatory of Music in the University of Toronto.
1926 Sir Ernest MacMillan became Dean of the Faculty of Music and Principal of the Toronto Conservatory of Music.
1934 “Courses of Instruction” were introduced, the first courses to be taught at the Faculty.
1945 Ettore Mazzoleni became Principal of the Conservatory. Edward Johnson was appointed to the Board of Governors of the University and the Conservatory.
1946 Arnold Walter established and was appointed Director of the Senior School for advanced students at the Conservatory. He also established the three-year Artist Diploma program and the Opera School.
1947 The Toronto Conservatory of Music received the Royal charter from King George VI, and became The Royal Conservatory of Music.
1952-1953 A new administrative structure was created – The Royal Conservatory of Music at the University of Toronto placed a Dean in charge of all music programs. There would be one Dean in charge of two divisions: The School of Music (the previous Royal Conservatory of Music) headed by a Principal (Ettore Mazzoleni) and the Faculty of Music, headed by a Director (Arnold Walter). The School of Music ran the opera school, examinations of grade 1 to ARCT, and the speech arts department. The Faculty of Music ran the Licentiate and Artist diploma courses, and the Senior School no longer existed. Boyd Neel was appointed Dean of the 'umbrella' RCMT.
1954 The first program for the Master of Music was introduced.
1958-1959 The University's President's Report announced that the Faculty of Music would have a new building and the School of Music would move to McMaster Hall on Bloor Street.
1959 Plans for an electronic music studio were announced, historically the second in a North American university.
1961-1962 The MusBac became a four-year program.
1962 The Faculty of Music moved to the newly built Edward Johnson Building (the first building in Canada designed specifically for professional music study), though the official opening was delayed until spring 1964, and the School of Music moved to McMaster Hall.
1966-1967 The first Bachelor of Music in Performance was offered.
1969 The Opera School transferred to the Faculty of Music and a two-year opera diploma program was approved.
1969-1970 A new curriculum was put into place – ‘basic music’ subjects in the first two years were common to all students. The Master of Music in Performance was approved.
1970 John Beckwith was appointed Dean. The post of Director of the Faculty of Music was eliminated. The Faculty became responsibility of the Dean, and the School of Music was renamed to its more popular name, the Royal Conservatory of Music.
1973-1974 This was the last year Conservatory performance certificates were accepted as alternatives for admission to the Faculty of Music. All incoming students were subsequently auditioned and interviewed.
1977 Gustav Ciamaga appointed Dean
1978-1979 Theory and Conducting majors were added to the undergraduate curriculum. The conducting major was discontinued in 1986.
1979-1980 The first jazz courses were offered.
1983-1984 The University created the Committee on the Future of Music Studies to review how the faculty and conservatory were operated and organized. In 1984, its final report recommended the eventual separation of the Conservatory from the University.
1984 Carl Morey appointed Dean.
1990 Paul Pedersen appointed Dean.
1991 The Royal Conservatory of Music Act of the Ontario Legislature confirms the separation of the Conservatory from the University of Toronto and re-established The Royal Conservatory's status as a fully independent, not-for-profit entity. The MusBac in Jazz Performance is introduced.
1996 David Beach appointed Dean.
2004 Gage Averill appointed Dean.
2007 Russell Hartenberger was appointed Interim Dean and named Dean in 2008.
2007 Concurrent Teacher's Education Program established, as well as the Doctorate in Musical Arts (DMA) in Performance.
2011 Don McLean appointed Dean.

Research and collaborations

Research institutes
The Music and Health Research Collaboratory (MaHRC), established in 2012, is a collaborative group of researchers that aims to better understand the role of sound in human experiences, exploring connections of sound to the human experience of health.

The Institute for Canadian Music, established in 1984, aims to promote and support all areas of Canadian Music Study.

Artists in residence
 Canadian Brass - Distinguished Ensemble in Residence 2011-2015
 Cecilia String Quartet - Ensemble in Residence
 Gryphon Trio - Artists in Residence
 Nexus - Resident Percussion Ensemble
 Tafelmusik - Baroque Orchestra in Residence
 Young Voices Toronto (formerly High Park Choirs of Toronto) - Children's Choir in Residence
 St. Lawrence String Quartet - Visiting Chamber Ensemble

Facilities

Edward Johnson Building – Home of the Faculty of Music since 1962, the Edward Johnson Building houses many offices and classrooms, as well as two floors of practice rooms, two large rehearsal rooms, the Faculty of Music Library, the University of Toronto Electronic Music Studio (UTEMS), a theatre for large ensemble performances (MacMillan Theatre) and a smaller recital hall (Walter Hall), and named for the Guelph-born operatic tenor, former board chair of the Royal Conservatory of Music, and General Manager of the Metropolitan Opera (1935-1950), Edward Johnson.

MacMillan Theatre – This 815-seat hall was designed for the production of operas and large ensemble concerts and named after former dean, Sir Ernest MacMillan. World-renowned for its excellent acoustics.

Walter Hall – Commemorating Arnold Walter, Director of the Faculty from 1952-1968, Walter Hall was designed for chamber concerts and recitals. The house seats 490. The hall also contains a two-manual tracker-action Casavant organ.

Library – A part of the University of Toronto Library System, it is the largest music research collection in Canada. It contains over 300,000 printed materials, 180,000 recordings in the Sniderman Recordings Archive, 2,500 volumes in the Olnick Rare Book Room, and 3,500 titles in the Performance Collection.

Electroacoustic Studio – The University of Toronto Electronic Music Studio opened in 1959. Originally located in a house on Division Street, it was moved to the Edward Johnson Building in 1963.

Degrees and programs

Undergraduate studies

Bachelor of Music in Performance (four-year program)
In the classical stream, major instruments include those in the woodwind, brass and strings families, as well as percussion, piano, voice, guitar, harp, organ, accordion and historical instruments. In the jazz program, major instruments include double bass, guitar, drums, piano, trumpet, trombone, saxophone and voice.

Bachelor of Music (four-year program)
Options for major include: Comprehensive, Composition, History and Theory, Music Education, and Concurrent Teacher Education (five-year program in partnership with OISE).

Advanced Certificate in Performance (one-year program)
This is a one-year program of intensive full-time study, open to woodwinds, brass, percussion, strings, piano, voice and accordion. Students enrolling in this program have the option of specializing in Baroque music, utilizing period instruments in conjunction with Tafelmusik.

Artist Diploma (3-year program)
This program is similar to the Bachelor of Music in Performance, but without academic-subject requirements. This is not open to students with a Bachelor of Music or a Bachelor of Music in Performance from the Faculty of Music.

Diploma in Operatic Performance (2- or 3-year program)
Three streams are available in this program – one for singers (2 or 3 years), one for operatic repetiteurs (2 years) and one for operatic stage directors (2 years).

Graduate studies

Music performance and composition programs
Programs include: MMus in Composition, in Music Technology and Digital Media, in Instrumental (solo piano, woodwinds, brass, percussion, strings), in Collaborative Piano, in Conducting, in Jazz Performance, in Opera, in Piano Pedagogy, in Voice and in Vocal Pedagogy; and DMA in Performance and in Composition.

Music program
Programs include: MA and PhD in Music Education, Musicology, Theory, Performance and Ethnomusicology.

Performance Ensembles
In addition to  large ensembles offered at the Faculty, there are various chamber music courses and collaborative piano courses. Most of these courses involve weekly masterclasses. There are also several world music ensemble courses offered, such as Japanese taiko drumming, African drumming and dancing, Latin-American percussion, Klezmer, tabla, Balinese Gamelan, Korean ensemble and steel pan.

Large ensembles
 University of Toronto Symphony Orchestra (UTSO) – conducted by Uri Mayer
 University of Toronto Wind Ensemble – conducted by Dr. Gillian MacKay
 University of Toronto Wind Symphony – conducted by Dr. Jeffrey Reynolds
 University of Toronto MacMillan Singers – conducted by Dr. Jamie Hillman
 University of Toronto Soprano/Alto Chorus – conducted by Dr. Elaine Choi
 University of Toronto Women's Chamber Choir – conducted by Dr. Lori Dolloff
 University of Toronto Tenor/Bass Chorus – conducted by Thomas Burton
 University of Toronto Jazz Orchestras – conducted by Jim Lewis
 University of Toronto Vocal Jazz Ensemble – conducted by Christine Duncan
 University of Toronto Guitar Orchestra - conducted by Rob MacDonald
 Contemporary Music Ensemble (gamUT) – directed by Wallace Halladay
 University of Toronto Percussion Ensemble – conducted by Beverley Johnston
 Early Music Ensembles – conducted by Ivars Taurins
 Schola Cantorum - conducted by Daniel Taylor

Annual events
New Music Festival - Each year, the Faculty of Music hosts the University of Toronto New Music Festival at the end of January. The festival plays host to at least one distinguished guest in composition.

Notable people

Past deans
1918-1927 Augustus Stephen Vogt

1927-1952 Sir Ernest MacMillan

1952-1968 Arnold Walter (Director)

1953-1970 Boyd Neel (Dean)

1970-1977 John Beckwith

1977-1984 Gustav Ciamaga

1984-1990 Carl Morey

1990-1995 Paul Pedersen

1995-1996 Robert Falck (Acting Dean)

1996-2004 David Beach

2004-2007 Gage Averill

2007-2010 Russell Hartenberger

2011–2021 Don McLean

2021-present Ellie Hisama

Notable faculty (past and present)
 Jacques Abram - pianist
 Robert Aitken - composer, flautist
 Raffi Armenian - conductor, composer, pianist
 John Beckwith - composer, writer, broadcaster, pianist 
 Boris Berlin - pianist
 Denis Brott - cellist
 Walter Buczynski - composer, pianist
 Chan Ka Nin - composer
 Andrew Dawes - violinist
 Lorand Fenyves - violinist
 Harry Freedman - composer, English hornist
 Hans Gruber - conductor
 Christos Hatzis - composer
 John Hawkins - composer, conductor
 Pierre Hétu - conductor, pianist
 Jamie Hillman - choral conductor
 Derek Holman - choral conductor, organist, composer
 Sandra Horst - pianist, vocal coach, choral conductor
 Jacques Israelievitch - violinist
 Kelly Jefferson - jazz saxophonist
 Richard Johnston - composer
 Norbert Kraft - guitarist
 Antonín Kubálek - pianist
 Gary Kulesha - composer
 Larysa Kuzmenko - composer, pianist
 Ettore Mazzoleni - conductor
 John McKay - pianist
 Albert Pratz - violinist, conductor, composer
 Godfrey Ridout - composer, conductor
 Eugene Rittich - horn
 Shauna Rolston - cellist
 Chase Sanborn - jazz trumpet
 Ezra Schabas
 Leo Smith - composer
 Frédérique Vézina - soprano 
 John Weinzweig - composer
 Carol Welsman - jazz vocalist and pianist
 S. Drummond Wolff - organist, choirmaster, composer
 John Wyre - percussionist, composer
 David Zafer - violinist

Notable alumni

Composers
 Kristi Allik
 Wayne Barlow
 John Beckwith
 Norma Beecroft
 Michael Bussiere
 Brian Cherney
 Gustav Ciamaga
 F. R. C. Clarke
 Mychael Danna
 Omar Daniel
 Samuel Dolin
 Leila Fletcher
 Clifford Ford
 Srul Irving Glick - composer
 David Grimes
 Kelsey Jones - composer, pianist
 Todor Kobakov - composer, pianist
 Serouj Kradjian - composer, pianist
 Veronika Krausas
 Bruce Mather - composer, pianist
 James Montgomery
 Éric Morin
 Owen Pallett - composer, violinist
 Donald Patriquin - composer, organist, choir conductor
 Paul Pedersen
 Bob Pritchard
 Imant Raminsh - composer, violinist, conductor
 John Rea
 James Rolfe - composer
 Clark Ross - composer, guitarist
 Terry Rusling - electronic composer
 David Squires
 Timothy Sullivan - Composer, music educator
 Peter Tahourdin
 Sandy Thorburn - composer, theatre director
 Kevin Turcotte - trumpet player
 John Weinzweig
 Alfred Whitehead - composer, organist, choral conductor
 Charles Wilson - composer, choral conductor
 Chan Wing-wah - conductor, composer

Conductors
 Nathan Brock - conductor
 Petar Dundjerski - flautist, conductor
 Victor Feldbrill - conductor, violinist
 James Gayfer - bandmaster, clarinettist, composer
 Graham George - composer, organist, choirmaster
 Elmer Iseler - choir conductor
 Brian Jackson - conductor
 Janko Kastelic - conductor
 Julian Kuerti - conductor
 Richard Lee - violinist, conductor
 Leon Major - opera and theatre director
 Evan Mitchell - conductor
 Glenn Price - conductor
 Wayne Strongman - conductor, Founding Managing Artistic Director, Tapestry New Opera

Instrumentalists
 James Campbell - clarinettist
 David Bourque - clarinettist
 Liona Boyd - guitarist
 David Braid - jazz pianist, composer
 Howard Brown - pianist
 Jarred Dunn - pianist
 David J. Elliott - trombonist, Professor of Music and Music Education, New York University
 Mark Fewer - violinist; Associate Professor, Schulich School of Music, McGill University
 Jonathan Freeman-Attwood - trumpet, Principal of the Royal Academy of Music in London
 Jeffrey McFadden - guitarist
 Attila Fias - jazz pianist, composer, arranger, recording artist
 Timothy Phelan - guitarist
 Walter Prystawski - violinist
 Erika Raum - violinist
 Yaroslav Senyshyn - pianist; Professor, Simon Fraser University
 Peter Elyakim Taussig - pianist, composer
 Fergus McWilliam - horn player, with Berlin Philharmonic
 Carolyn Gadiel Warner - violinist, pianist with the Cleveland Orchestra

Musicologists and others
 Gregory G. Butler - Professor Emeritus (musicology), University of British Columbia
 Eric Chafe - Victor and Gwendolyn Beinfield Professor of Music, Brandeis University
 Beverley Diamond - Canada Research Chair in Traditional Music, Ethnomusicology, Professor at Memorial University
 Cliff Eisen - Associate Editor, New Köchel Catalogue, King's College London
 Jonathan Freeman-Attwood - Principal, Royal Academy of Music in London
 Helmut Kallmann - Canadian Music historian
 Simon Morrison - Professor of Music, Princeton
 Paolo Pietropaolo - music journalist and CBC Radio broadcaster
 Alison Pybus - Vice-President, Vocal Division, IMG Artists, New York
 Peter Simon - President, Royal Conservatory of Music

Vocalists
 Russell Braun - baritone
 Measha Brueggergosman - soprano
 Ariana Chris - mezzo-soprano
 Sally Dibblee - soprano
 John Fanning - baritone
 Barbara Fris - soprano
 Barbara Hannigan - soprano
 Rosemarie Landry - soprano
 Ermanno Mauro - tenor
 Mary Morrison - soprano
 Patricia O'Callaghan - soprano
 Mark Pedrotti - baritone
 Adrianne Pieczonka - soprano
 Brett Polegato - baritone
 David Pomeroy - tenor
 Teresa Stratas - soprano
 Jon Vickers - heldentenor
 Emily d'Angelo - mezzo-soprano

See also
 Music of Canada
 Music of Ontario

Notes

External links
 
 Archival collection at University of Toronto Music Library

Music
Music schools in Canada
Educational institutions established in 1844
1844 establishments in Canada